John of Denmark or John the Elder (aka Hans the Elder) ( or ; ;) (29 June 1521 - 1 October 1580; born and died in Haderslev) was the only Duke of Schleswig-Holstein-Haderslev.  The predicate the Elder is sometimes used to distinguish him from his nephew, John the Younger, who held Sønderborg from 1564 as a partitioned-off duke. As a co-ruler in the duchies of Holstein and of Schleswig, John the Elder is numbered as John II, continuing counting King John of Denmark as John I, Duke of Holstein and Schleswig.

Family 

John was the son of King Frederick I of Denmark and his second wife, Sophie of Pomerania.  As a possible heir to the throne, he enjoyed a careful education and spent several years at the court of his brother-in-law Albert, Duke of Prussia, in Königsberg. This was in Lutheran Ducal Prussia, a Polish fief, modernized into a secular state from the Teutonic State of Prussia since 1525. This successful policy would be seminal for John's understanding of politics and the state, as he also never became a fully sovereign prince.

Reign as Duke (1544–1580) 
From 1544, John ruled the duchies of Schleswig and of Holstein jointly with his brother, Adolf of Denmark, and his half-brother, King Christian III of Denmark. He ruled from Haderslevhus Castle and later built Hansborg Castle in his hometown, a magnificent Renaissance palace situated east of the city of Haderslev.

His territory consisted of the Counties of Haderslev, including Tørning, Tønder, and Løgumkloster, and the islands of Nordstrand and Fehmarn in Schleswig, plus Rendsburg and some smaller communities in Holstein.

During his reign, John joined the Reformation and founded several social and educational institutions, notably the Duke John Hospital in Haderslev.  He introduced many reforms to the legal system and was regarded as a dedicated judge.  As one of the first rulers between the seas, he sat down for an active land reclamation and coastal protection program, presumably, he ruled over the most vulnerable stretch of the Schleswig coastline.  In 1559, John, his brother Adolf, and King Christian's successor, Frederick II of Denmark, occupied the independent peasant Republic of Dithmarschen, and divided it among themselves.

John died unmarried and childless in 1580.  After his death, his territory was divided between his brother and nephew, Adolf and Frederick II of Denmark respectively.

Legacy 
In contrast to most of the dukes of Schleswig and Holstein, posterity has a very positive view of John the Elder.  This holds especially for his capital Haderslev, which was a ducal residence only during his time and has benefited ever since.  he is still popular as a sort of patron saint.  The largest annual summer festival in Haderslev, the Hertug-Hans-Fest is named after, and the local brewery Fuglsang has named a beer after him (Hertug Hans Pils).  Even the hospital (which he founded) still bears his name.  His judgments were fully published in book form (De Hansborgske Dømme).

Ancestry

Sources 
 Thomas Otto Achelis: Haderslev i gamle Dage 1292–1626, Haderslev, 1929
 Troels Fink: Hertug Hans den Ældre, in: Sønderjyske Årbøger, 1997, p. 37–58
 Lennart S. Madsen: Junker Christian og hertug Hans den Ældre, in: Inge Adriansen, Lennart S. Madsen and Carsten Porskrog Rasmussen: De slesvigske hertuger, Aabenraa, 2005, p. 87–118
 Emilie Andersen (ed.): De Hansborgske Registranter, two volumes, Copenhagen 1943 and 1949
 Emilie Andersen (ed.): De Hansborgske Domme 1545–1578, three volumes, Copenhagen, 1994

Dukes of Schleswig-Holstein
16th-century Danish people
16th-century German people
House of Oldenburg in Schleswig-Holstein
1521 births
1580 deaths
People from Haderslev Municipality
People of the Count's Feud
Sons of kings